William Bagot may refer to:

William Bagot (politician) (died 1407), favourite of King Richard II of England and a major character in Shakespeare's Richard II
William Bagot, 1st Baron Bagot (1728–1798), British politician
William Bagot, 2nd Baron Bagot (1773–1856), British peer
William Bagot, 3rd Baron Bagot (1811–1887), British courtier and Conservative politician
William Bagot, 4th Baron Bagot (1857–1932), British peer and Conservative politician

See also
Baron Bagot